Ciril Pelhan (4 November 1921 – 20 May 2011) was a Yugoslav swimmer. He competed in the men's 4 × 200 metre freestyle relay at the 1948 Summer Olympics.

References

1921 births
2011 deaths
Slovenian male swimmers
Yugoslav male swimmers
Olympic swimmers of Yugoslavia
Swimmers at the 1948 Summer Olympics
Sportspeople from Ljubljana